The Neck may refer to:

 The Neck, Newfoundland and Labrador, Canada
 The Neck, Philadelphia, Pennsylvania, United States
 The Neck, New Zealand, an isthmus between Lake Wanaka and Lake Hāwea
 The Neck on Skomer, Pembrokeshire, Wales

See also

 Neck (disambiguation)
 The Necks, an experimental jazz trio from Sydney, Australia